This article describes the influence of exercise on the persons who suffer from diabetes.

Diabetes mellitus 
Diabetes mellitus, also known as type II diabetes, is a disease that affects over three million people in the U.S. per year. This disease affects the glucose levels in the body by causing them to rise higher than normal. In type II diabetic patients, the body develops an insulin resistance that initiates an increase in blood glucose levels.

Exercise and diabetes 
One danger for diabetes patients is cardiovascular disease, including lipids and blood glucose levels. Poor aerobic exercise has also been linked to cardiovascular diseases, and by improving the level of aerobic activity, and therefore decreasing plasma insulin levels, the danger of cardiovascular disease significantly decreases.

The main risk for diabetes patients is controlling glucose levels. There has been lots of research done on the positive effects of physical activity on lowering glucose levels. Physical exercise can include walking or swimming and does not have to be cardio intensive. If patients are able to perform 30 minutes of exercise most days of the week, they can significantly lower their chances of having type II diabetes. Resistance exercise has been shown to improve insulin and glucose levels greatly by helping to manage blood pressure levels, cardiovascular risk, glucose tolerance, and lipids.

Exercise and diabetes studies 
The New England Journal of Health performed a study on the effect of physical activity on men with diabetes mellitus. The study was one in which questionnaires were given to 5,990 males who had attended the University of Pennsylvania. These men were chosen based on their lifestyles and their risk for getting diabetes. The men ranged from ages 39 to 68 and their body mass indexes ranged from 14.1 to 46.0. To measure physical activity, their kilocalories per week were measured. The energy expenditure in kilocalories was measured, and the results showed that the more physical activity done, the lower the chance of diabetes. About 50 percent of the men who increased their kilocalorie rate by increasing their physical activity were able to avoid getting the disease.

The Journal of the American Medical Association looked at the effect that physical activity had on diabetic patients who took diabetes medications. The patients were all assigned a personal trainer who helped them perform routine exercises five to six times a week and keep a stable diet for the duration of the 12-month study. Doctors monitored these patients and slowly started reducing their medications. If their glucose levels remained stable, the medication continued to decrease, but if it increased, the medication was added back to keep the patient’s diabetes controlled. At the end of the 12 months, 73 percent of the participants were on a reduced medication list as a result of this lifestyle change. 56 percent of the patients had made so much progress that they could be taken off all their previous medications and control their diabetes by maintaining this new, healthier regime. The improvement of the patients’ lifestyle by keeping active and eating correctly was shown to help manage diabetes mellitus.

References 

Diabetes
Physical exercise